Human Stuff is a 1920 American silent Western film produced and released by Universal Pictures, directed by B. Reeves Eason and starring Harry Carey. It is not known whether the film currently survives.

Cast
 Harry Carey as James 'Jim' Pierce
 Rudolph Christians as 'Washboard' Pierce
 Charles Le Moyne as Bull Elkins
 Joe Harris as Ramero
 Fontaine La Rue as Boka
 Ruth Fuller Golden as Jasmes' Sister
 Mary Charleson as Lee Tyndal
 Bobby Mack as Butler

See also
 Harry Carey filmography

References

External links
 
 
 Lantern slide; Human Stuff

1920 films
1920 Western (genre) films
American black-and-white films
Films directed by B. Reeves Eason
Silent American Western (genre) films
Universal Pictures films
1920s American films